West Africans may refer to:

 West Africa, for contemporary inhabitants of West Africa
 Negroid, an obsolete racial grouping for populations derived from West African stock
 West Africans in the United States

See also
 East Africans
 North Africans
 Southern Africa